is a shōjo manga by Miyoshi Tomori first serialized in Biweekly Margaret and licensed by Viz Media.

Plot 
Maria Kawai transfers to Totsuka High School after being expelled from her previous school St. Katria - a catholic school for girls. Upon entering the classroom and hearing the students gossip, she bluntly states that the reason for her expulsion was an act of violence on her teacher.
The sharp tongue and frank nature hidden under her pretty face immediately makes Maria an outcast among her classmates. After all, she was told that she "taints others." She's like a mirror that reflects people's real characters.
Nevertheless, Maria hopes for a fresh start. She manages to become close with two of her classmates after they hear her beautiful singing (the song is Amazing Grace and Maria often sings it in the manga). One is Yusuke Kanda, who's kind and friendly to everyone on the outside, but inside isn't that way at all. He teaches her a "lovely spin" which should help her get along with others better, but it just makes her seem even more intimidating. Maria, apparently, isn't a "lovely spin" kind of a girl. The other is Shin Meguro. He is tall, dark-haired and always frowning. Coming from a family of musicians, he knew right away which song Maria was singing. Meguro is a returnee but Maria points out that because he lacks communication skills he doesn't really know how to speak English. Throughout the year Maria faces many problems, mainly relating to getting along with others but soon resolves it with the constant help of her friends and bluntness.

Characters
Maria Kawai
The protagonist of the story, Maria has a cold personality which estranges herself from her classmates. She says what she wants, albeit too bluntly and harsh, even when she intends to help others. Her arrogant facade and point blank statements are the reasons she is hated by most people and it seems she too is indifferent towards them. Emphasized throughout the manga, Maria also is shown to have the ability to see the true natures of people around her, or—more simply—their flaws. Although she maintains this air of superiority, she actually yearns for acceptance and friendship. Even when knowing the unpleasant outcomes, she often steps into troublesome situations just to prove herself to others. Everyone thinks that she is a devil but they don't know that they're the devils. She gives special regard to Kanda Yusuke but exhibits much stronger feelings for Meguro Shin, stating that she feels Shin is much closer to her than God and she is much more afraid of being hated by him. Later she realizes she is in love with him. She likes nursery rhymes and hymns like "Amazing Grace." She apparently got expelled because of "punching the teacher/nun," but it has not been explained in detail, though it was revealed that the cross she always wears is from that teacher/nun. She has a habit of pushing out her lips and having her eyes half open when someone says something that annoys her. 
Shin Meguro
Shin dislikes drawing attention to himself and prefers to observe situations. He is often cold and aloof towards his classmates, and Yusuke's constant pestering irritates him. At first, he treated Maria with disdain, appearing to want nothing to do with her, but circumstances proved otherwise and he seems to actually care greatly for her. He pretends to be "rude" to Maria thinking that his actions would somehow lead the other girls to sympathize with her. In Chapter 4, he scooped up Maria in the middle of the class and declared that he would take her to a hospital because of her sprained ankle, making a scene as they leave. Then, he secretly bought Maria a pair of flashy shoes (apart from the ballet shoes he already bought for her) even after earlier commenting that they looked stupid. Despite claiming that he does not want anything to do with her, he finds himself falling in love with Maria, but there is no way that he'd let the "devil" discover his feelings. It is later revealed his "loner" persona comes from an incident when he was a kid where he "choked" during his large piano debut making the media destroy his image. In chapter 23, Meguro insists he will stand by Kawai Maria's side no matter what happens.
Yusuke Kanda
Yusuke is a bubbly and cheerful person, who is popular with the girls and generally well-liked. Much to Shin's chagrin, Yusuke always has an idiotic grin pasted on his face. Initially, he develops a liking for Maria as she is very beautiful and has an intriguing personality. He is the first student to approach her and constantly pops up wherever she is. While he is extremely fond of her, it is not yet revealed if it is more than admiration. It seems as if he knows that Meguro likes Maria, because in chapter 11 he calls Meguro out and tells him that if he doesn't step up he might "steal Maria away". Yusuke taught Maria the "lovely transform". He calls Shin "Megu-chin" and Maria, "Maria-chi". His face forms a comical style with thick dark outlined eyes and a w-shaped smiled when someone (mainly Kawai) is blatantly against one of his ideas. He also confessed his love to Maria later in the series.
Teacher
He is their homeroom teacher and usually is shown to have no real care for his job or his students. He often uses Kawai as a scapegoat when something goes wrong, even when confronted by Yusuke of these ways he just smiled and accused Yuske of standing up for her because he was in love with Kawai. He always tries to find a way to get Kawai expelled, even giving a necklace he confiscated from Kawai to Hana in hopes that she would attack her to get it back. He showed his lowest point where he poured ink all over Kawai, and when he arrived in the room stated she ran away. Once she enters still drenched in ink, he goes off accusing the students as they had a grudge against her, even going as far as to accuse that Kawai did it herself to gain sympathy, where it wasn't till after all that did he admit it was him and he spilled it on "accident", though would only publicly state that if she announced she had reformed thanks to "her loving teacher's guidance".
Hana Ibuki
A sickly girl who arrives later in the manga because she has been hospitalized since before the start. She appears to be Kawai's opposite in every way as she is cheerful and popular. When she first returned to school, she noticed the necklace the teacher took from Kawai which he then gives her (seemingly as a way to get Kawai expelled in hopes she would attack Hana to get it back), however, she instead tries to befriend Kawai which goes well. Until she discovers that Yusuke confessed to Kawai, as she has feelings for Yusuke and even asked earlier if Kawai had feelings for him, which she denied but believes she is lying. Because of her outbursts, Kawai believes that she is only doing this because she likes the attention. Which maybe true as with anything that happens she is prone to emotional outbursts that get the rest of the classes attention in the matter, shown where Kawai causally pointed out that the cross was missing from the necklace, only for her to have an emotional outburst about it being missing. At the end of chapter 17 it appears that Hana is losing her sanity, smiling evilly with a blank look in her eyes. Later she conspires with the classmates against Kawai to have everyone hate her by setting her up with vicious comments about the other students in her bag, however this seems to quickly falls apart when Shin points out that she says what she feels without hesitation and wouldn't write that, as well as Kawai seeing through Hana's "help". However, later she sets Kawai up to make it look like she really did write it and ultimately suggests splitting up the group. In the end is stated to be the head of the group. This causes Kawai to show aggression for the first time, as she was truly dedicated to her role as the Choir Leader and correcting Hana when she thought that Kawai hated her, where she just didn't see her as a friend, calling her a Bad Friend. However, Hana finally shows her true colors and confirms that the teachers only set up Kawai as the Leader as a way to promote the school. Hana makes a conspiracy against Kawai to make herself look good at the choir competition. Hana finds out that reporters are going to be there. She gets even madder when Kawai ruins her plan 'accidentally' and bursts with anger in front of the camera. The reporters realize that Hana and everyone are misunderstanding Kawai.
Tomoyo Kousaka
She is first introduced to us as Nippachi (apparently because she always gets a 28/100 in tests and is always grinning). Upon hearing this Maria stated that Tomoyo was looking down on the very girls that called her Nippachi. This aggravated those girls a lot, and shocked Tomoyo (indicating in a way that Maria was correct). Later, the other girls in the class made Tomoyo give an invitation to Maria for a fake welcome party for herself. The reality was that the girls in the class were going to make Tomoyo drink a lot of alcohol and then say that Maria made her do so. They supposed this would work because they already convinced Tomoyo to lie and say that Maria beat her up earlier. Upon receiving the invitation, Maria, who was already aware that no good would come to the party stated that “I think, no matter how much filth you show, I need to go”. Hearing this Tomoyo pushed Maria down the stairs, insisting that she was not filthy like Maria. Tomoyo ended up crying. Then Kanda Yuusuke showed up at the party with Tomoyo. He smoothed out the whole situation. The next day, Tomoyo appeared in school with a cast around her legs and crutches. Then the other girls insisted that Maria pushed her, which was not true. The other girls in the class asked Maria to be Tomoyo's replacement; Maria abruptly refused, saying that she could not just go around smiling at everyone, and that she could only be herself. It was very soon after that the class discovered that the cast was fake. They then began to call Nippachi a liar, even though Nippachi insisted that she fell down the stairs that morning, which was later proven wrong. Tomoyo did not show up to school for the next week. This was later considered a problem, so the class and teacher told Maria to bring Tomoyo back to school. She and Kanda went to her house together. They spoke to her normally and then left. The following day, Maria went to Tomoyo's house before school and told her to come to school with her. At school, Nippachi defended Maria and also put an end to the other students and the teacher calling her Nippachi. This begins the friendship between the two of them.
Ayu Nakamura
Ayu cares a lot about how she looks and takes a long time doing her makeup and hair in the morning. Because of her ego and jealousy over Maria's looks, she tries to make Maria look bad in front of the class. Maria's classmates, excluding Yuusuke and Shin, start to hate Kawai even more because of Ayu. But when Maria's words help Ayu confess her love to Yuusuke, she realizes Maria isn't too bad.
Anna Mouri
A former close friend of Maria's from St. Katria Girls School. The two girls became friends when Anna heard Maria singing Amazing Grace they became very close because Maria, even at her old school found it hard to relate to others so she had no other friends. Anna was a very cheerful girl and got along well with the other girls until she lost her voice in an accident. Maria being friends with her said she would be her voice for her. Slowly Maria noticed the space growing between them and one day Maria saw Anna form the words "you corrupt others" which soon ended the friendship. She and Maria meets again soon after Shin starts to take piano lessons again.

Manga 
Completed with thirteen volumes published by Shueisha. Also licensed by Tong Li Publishing in Taiwan, Kana in France. Viz Media is releasing the series in print and digital formats.

References

Further reading

External links 
 A Devil and Her Love Song at Viz Media
 

2007 manga
Coming-of-age anime and manga
Romance anime and manga
Shōjo manga
Shueisha manga
Viz Media manga